Sakura Tower is a 20-story modern office building in Kyauktada Township, Yangon, Myanmar. The  tower was completed by Japanese contractors in 1999 and had been the tallest building in Myanmar from 1999 to 2016.

It stands opposite to Sule Shangri-La Hotel across the Sule Pagoda Road.

Yangon Japanese Association resides on the 12th floor.

Notes

References

Buildings and structures in Yangon
Office buildings completed in 1999
Japan–Myanmar relations